= Special student =

Special student may refer to:

- A non-matriculated student at a U.S. college or university
- A student enrolled in a special education program
